In mathematics, a real function  of real numbers is said to be uniformly continuous if there is a positive real number  such that function values over any function domain interval of the size  are as close to each other as we want.

So uniform continuity is a stronger continuity condition than continuity; a function that is uniformly continuous is continuous but a function that is continuous is not necessarily uniformly continuous. The concepts of uniform continuity and continuity can be expanded to functions defined between metric spaces. 

However, any Lipschitz map between metric spaces is uniformly continuous, in particular any isometry (distance-preserving map). 

Although continuity can be defined for functions between general topological spaces, defining uniform continuity requires more structure. The concept relies on comparing the sizes of neighbourhoods of distinct points, so it requires a metric space, or more generally a uniform space.

Definition for functions on metric spaces 

Definition of uniform continuity 

 Equivalently,  is said to be uniformly continuous if . Here quantifications (and ) are used.
 Alternatively,  is said to be uniformly continuous if there is a function of all positive real numbers ,  representing the maximum positive real number, such that for every  if  then .  is a monotonically non-decreasing function.

Definition of (ordinary) continuity 

Thus, (ordinary) continuity is a local property of the function at the point .
 Equivalently, a function  is said to be continuous if .
At every ,  is a monotonically non-decreasing function.

Local continuity versus global uniform continuity 
Continuity is a local property of a function — that is, a function  is continuous, or not, at a particular point  of the function domain , and this can be determined by looking at only the values of the function in an arbitrarily small neighbourhood of that point. When we speak of a function being continuous on an interval, we mean that the function is continuous at every point of the interval. On the other hand, it is possible to give a definition that is local in terms of the natural extension (the characteristics of which at nonstandard points are determined by the global properties of ), although it is not possible to give a local definition of uniform continuity for an arbitrary hyperreal-valued function, see below.

 ,

For uniform continuity, the order of the first, second, and third quantifications (and ) are rotated:
 .
Thus for continuity on the interval, one takes an arbitrary point  of the interval, and then there must exist a distance ,
 
while for uniform continuity, a single  must work uniformly for all points  of the interval,

Properties 

Every uniformly continuous function is continuous, but the converse does not hold. Consider for instance the continuous function  where  is the set of real numbers. But
 
and as  goes to be a higher and higher value,  needs to be lower and lower to satisfy  for positive real numbers  and the given .

Any absolutely continuous function (over a compact interval) is uniformly continuous. On the other hand, the Cantor function is uniformly continuous but not absolutely continuous.

The image of a totally bounded subset under a uniformly continuous function is totally bounded. However, the image of a bounded subset of an arbitrary metric space under a uniformly continuous function need not be bounded: as a counterexample, consider the identity function from the integers endowed with the discrete metric to the integers endowed with the usual Euclidean metric.

The Heine–Cantor theorem asserts that every continuous function on a compact set is uniformly continuous. In particular, if a function is continuous on a closed bounded interval of the real line, it is uniformly continuous on that interval. The Darboux integrability of continuous functions follows almost immediately from this theorem.

This is a generalization of the Heine-Cantor theorem mentioned above, since .

Examples and nonexamples

Examples 
 Linear functions  are the simplest examples of uniformly continuous functions.
 Any continuous function on the interval  is also uniformly continuous, since  is a compact set.
 Every function which is differentiable and has bounded derivative is uniformly continuous.
 Every Lipschitz continuous map between two metric spaces is uniformly continuous. More generally, every Hölder continuous function is uniformly continuous.
This shows uniformly continuous functions are not always differentiable.
 Despite being nowhere differentiable, the Weierstrass function is uniformly continuous.
 Every member of a uniformly equicontinuous set of functions is uniformly continuous.

Nonexamples 
 Functions that are unbounded on a bounded domain are not uniformly continuous.
 Functions that have slopes that become unbounded on an infinite domain cannot be uniformly continuous.

Visualization 
For functions that are not uniformly continuous, this isn't possible; for these functions, the graph might lie inside the height of the rectangle at some point on the graph but there is a point on the graph where the graph lies above or below the rectangle. (the graph penetrates the top or bottom side of the rectangle.)

History 
The first published definition of uniform continuity was by Heine in 1870, and in 1872 he published a proof that a continuous function on an open interval need not be uniformly continuous. The proofs are almost verbatim given by Dirichlet in his lectures on definite integrals in 1854. The definition of uniform continuity appears earlier in the work of Bolzano where he also proved that continuous functions on an open interval do not need to be uniformly continuous.  In addition he also states that a continuous function on a closed interval is uniformly continuous, but he does not give a complete proof.

Other characterizations

Non-standard analysis 
In non-standard analysis, a real-valued function  of a real variable is microcontinuous at a point  precisely if the difference  is infinitesimal whenever  is infinitesimal. Thus  is continuous on a set  in  precisely if  is microcontinuous at every real point . Note that there exist hyperreal-valued functions which meet this criterion but are not uniformly continuous, as well as uniformly continuous hyperreal-valued functions which do not meet this criterion, however, such functions cannot be expressed in the form  for any real-valued function . (see non-standard calculus for more details and examples).

Cauchy continuity 

For a function between metric spaces, uniform continuity implies Cauchy continuity . If a function  is uniformly continuous then for every pair of sequences  and  such that

we have

Relations with the extension problem 

A question to answer: When can  be extended to a continuous function on all of ?

Therefore when  is complete,  extends to a continuous function  if and only if  is Cauchy-continuous.

The converse does not hold, since the function  is, as seen above, not uniformly continuous, but it is continuous and thus Cauchy continuous. In general, for functions defined on unbounded spaces like , uniform continuity is a rather strong condition. It is desirable to have a weaker condition from which to deduce extendability.

For example, suppose  is a real number. The identity

 

A typical application of the extendability of a uniformly continuous function is the proof of the inverse Fourier transformation formula. We first prove that the formula is true for test functions, there are densely many of them. We then extend the inverse map to the whole space using the fact that linear map is continuous; thus, uniformly continuous.

Generalization to topological vector spaces 

For linear transformations , uniform continuity is equivalent to continuity. This fact is frequently used implicitly in functional analysis to extend a linear map off a dense subspace of a Banach space.

Generalization to uniform spaces 
Just as the most natural and general setting for continuity is topological spaces, the most natural and general setting for the study of uniform continuity are the uniform spaces.

In this setting, it is also true that uniformly continuous maps transform Cauchy sequences into Cauchy sequences.

Each compact Hausdorff space possesses exactly one uniform structure compatible with the topology. A consequence is a generalization of the Heine-Cantor theorem: each continuous function from a compact Hausdorff space to a uniform space is uniformly continuous.

See also

References

Further reading 
  Chapter II is a comprehensive reference of uniform spaces.
 
 
 
 
 

Theory of continuous functions
Calculus
Mathematical analysis
General topology